Mehmet Leblebi (1908 – 25 February 1972) was a Turkish professional footballer. He spent the entirety of his career with his hometown club, Galatasaray SK. He also represented Turkey on 16 occasions, and played for them at the 1924 Summer Olympics and the 1928 Summer Olympics.

Career
Leblebi was born in Pınarhisar and played his entire career as a forward and midfielder for Galatasaray SK. Like many other Galatasaray players at that time, he was a student of the Galatasaray High School and started playing football there at the Grand Cour.

Leblebi was selected to Galatasaray A2 team when he was 12. Only three years later, he started to play with Galatasaray's A team,

Leblebi won the Istanbul Football League five times. He also scored 14 goals when Galatasaray beat Vefa SK 20-0 on 20 November 1925.

Career statistics

International goals

Honours

As player
 Galatasaray
 Istanbul Football League: 1924–25, 1925–26, 1926–27, 1928–29, 1930–31
 Istanbul Kupası: 1933

See also
List of one-club men

References

1908 births
1972 deaths
Turkish footballers
Turkey international footballers
Galatasaray S.K. footballers
People from Pınarhisar
Galatasaray High School alumni
Footballers at the 1924 Summer Olympics
Footballers at the 1928 Summer Olympics
Olympic footballers of Turkey
Association football forwards